Tubulin alpha 4b is a protein that in humans is encoded by the TUBA4B gene.

References